Luděk Pešek (April 26, 1919 – December 4, 1999) was a Czech artist and novelist noted for his representations of astronomical subjects. Born in Kladno in what is now the Czech Republic, he died in Stäfa, Switzerland. The asteroid 6584 Ludekpesek is named after him. He was influenced by Lucien Rudaux.

Biography 
Ludek Pesek was born in 1919 at Kladno, Czechoslovakia, and grew up in the mining town of Ostrava close to the Beskydy Mountains. His boyhood was marked by the longing for mountains, and distant lands, laying the ground for his later interest in geology and astronomy. His potential artistic and literary talents were recognized early, and encouraged by his art teacher at grammar school. It was also on that occasion, that he first had the opportunity to use an astronomical telescope. At the age of fifteen, Ludek acquired a painter's easel, and began to practice his hobby earnestly. Later, he attended the Academy of Fine Arts in Prague.

He produced his first art works around the age of 19. His first publications were The Moon and Planets (1963), and Our Planet Earth (1967). His work first reached US readers through the National Geographic Magazine, which commissioned him to do a series of works about Mars. Previous to the Mars article, he had painted 15 scenes for an article called Journey to the Planets in August 1970. In 1967, Ludek wrote his first science-fiction novel, Log of a Moon Expedition, which he illustrated in black and white. Another, The Earth Is Near, won Prize of Honour in Germany in 1971. It was published in the UK and United States in 1974. He illustrated Space Shuttles in 1976. He worked with writer Peter Ryan on several slim books for children: Journey to the Planets (1972), Planet Earth (1972), The Ocean World (1973), and UFOs and Other Worlds (1975); he later worked with the same author on the large-format Solar System (1978). He also illustrated the excellent Bildatlas des Sonnensystems (1974), with German text by Bruno Stanek.

From 1981 to 1985, he produced a series of 35 paintings on The Planet Mars, and a series of 50 paintings, Virgin Forests in the USA, one of which can be seen on the Earth page.

He produced several 360-degree panoramas for projection in the domes of the planetariums at Stuttgart, Winnipeg, and Lucerne, and exhibited in Washington, D.C., Boston, Nashville, Stuttgart, Berne, Lucerne, Zurich, and other venues. His work is in the collection of the Smithsonian Institution.

Books in English
The Ocean World – by Peter Ryan and Ludek Pesek – 1973 
The Earth is Near – 1974 
UFOs and Other Worlds – by Peter Ryan and Ludek Pesek – 1975 
An Island for Two – 1975 
A Beautiful, Peaceful World – by Hans-Joachim Gelberg and Willi Glasauer – 1976 
Log of a Moon Expedition – 1969 
Trap For Perseus – 1980 
The Moon and the Planets – by Josef Sadil and Ludek Pesek – 1963
Journey to the planets – by Peter Ryan and Ludek Pesek – 1972

Notes and references

Ludek Pesek - Space Artist

See also
List of space artists

External links
Ludek Pesek - Space Artist

1919 births
1999 deaths
Czech science fiction writers
Swiss science fiction writers
Czech speculative fiction artists
Swiss speculative fiction artists
Space artists
Czechoslovak artists
People from Stäfa
Czechoslovak emigrants to Switzerland
Czechoslovak writers